Gilla Íosa Mor mac Donnchadh MacFhirbhisigh (fl. 1390 – 1418) was a historian, scribe and poet of the learned Clan MacFhirbhisigh based at Lackan in Tír Fhíacrach, now part of County Sligo. He was the chief compiler of the Yellow Book of Lecan and the Great Book of Lecan, both of which are valuable literary and historical texts.

Sources

 The Celebrated Antiquary, Nollaig Ó Muraíle, Maynooth, 1996.
 Irish Leaders and Learning Through the Ages, Paul Walsh (priest), 2004. (ed. Nollaig Ó Muraíle).

15th-century Irish poets
15th-century Irish historians
14th-century births
15th-century deaths
Irish chroniclers
People from County Sligo
Irish scribes
Medieval European scribes
Irish genealogists
Irish male poets
Irish-language writers